Bernardino Baldi (5 June 1553 – 10 October 1617) was an Italian mathematician, poet, translator and priest.

Baldi descended from a noble family from Urbino, Marche, where he was born. He pursued his studies at Padua, and is said to have spoken about sixteen languages during his lifetime, though according to Tiraboschi the inscription on his tomb limits the number to twelve.

The appearance of the plague at Padua forced him to return to his native city. Shortly afterwards he was called to act as tutor to Ferrante Gonzaga, from whom he received the rich abbey of Guastalla. The oldest biography of Nicolaus Copernicus was completed on 7 October 1588 by him. He held office as abbot for 25 years, and then returned once again to Urbino. In 1612 he was employed by the duke as his envoy to Venice. Baldi died at Urbino on 12 October 1617.

He is said to have written upwards of a hundred different works, the chief part of which have remained unpublished. His various works show his abilities as a theologian, mathematician, geographer, antiquary, historian and poet. The Cronica dei Matematici (published at Urbino in 1707) is an abridgement of a larger work on which he had written for twelve years, and was intended to contain the lives of more than two hundred mathematicians. His life has been written of by Affò, Mazzucchelli and others.

See also
List of Roman Catholic scientist-clerics

Writing

Scientific Works
De gli automati, overo machine se moventi, Volume 2 (Venice, 1589; repr. 1601), On Automatons; Author: Hero of Alexandria, translated from the Greek 
Scamilli impares Vitruviani (Augsburg, 1612)
De Vitruvianorum verborum significatione (Augsburg, 1612) -- a.k.a. Lexicon Vitruvianum 
Heronis Ctesibii Belopoeeca (Augsburg, 1616)
In mechanica Aristotelis problemata exercitationes. (Aristotle's Mechanics) (Mainz, 1621)
Cronica de matematici, overo Epitome dell'istoria delle vite loro (Urbino, 1707)

Other works

La corona dell'anno (Venice, 1589)
Versi e Prose di Monsignor Bernardino Baldi da Urbino (Venice, 1590)
II Lauro, scherzo giouenile (Pavia, 1600)
La Deifobe, overo gli oracoli della Sibilla Cumea Monodia (Venice, 1604) (About the Oracles of the Cumaean Sibyl)
Il Diluvio universale, cantato, con nuova maniera di versi (Pavia, 1604)
Concetti morali (Rome, 1607)
Oratione di Bernardino Baldi ... alla Serenità del nouvo Duce M. Antonio Memmo (Venice, 1613)
In tabvlam aeneam Evgvbinam, lingua Hetrusca veteri perscriptam, divinatio (Augusta Vindelicorum, 1613)
La Nautica: Poema
Encomio della patria (1706)

Notes

References
 
 
 Rose, Rose and Wright, A New General Biographical Dictionary (1857), pp. 46-48. (in Google Books)

External links

Online Galleries, History of Science Collections, University of Oklahoma Libraries High resolution images of works by and/or portraits of Bernardino Baldi in .jpg and .tiff format.

1533 births
1617 deaths
People from Urbino
16th-century Italian Roman Catholic priests
17th-century Italian Roman Catholic priests
Christian Hebraists
16th-century Italian mathematicians
17th-century Italian mathematicians
Catholic clergy scientists
17th-century Italian writers
17th-century Italian male writers